Potok v Črni is a small dispersed settlement on Black Creek, a tributary of the Kamnik Bistrica River, in the Municipality of Kamnik in the Upper Carniola region of Slovenia.

References

External links

Potok v Črni on Geopedia

Populated places in the Municipality of Kamnik